abdulrajak Mulla

Mulla is a surname. It is distinct from Mulla(h), which is a title that is occasionally prefixed to the name of a cleric.

Notable persons 
 Ali Ahmed Mulla, muazzin of Masjid al-Haram, Mecca, Saudi Arabia
 Anand Narain Mulla (1901–1997), Urdu poet of India
 Asif Mulla (born 1980), Indian-born Canadian cricketer
 Fateen Mulla, Israeli Druze politician
 Jagat Narain Mulla (1864–1938), lawyer and public prosecutor of India
 Mahendra Nath Mulla, officer of the Indian Navy
 Mohsin Mulla (born 1981), Indian-born Canadian cricketer
 Paul Mulla (1882–1959), Turkish Cretan Catholic priest

Indian surnames
Surnames of Arabic origin